London Fashion Film Festival is a London based annual event established by professionals from within the fashion and film industries to showcase creative talents in the genre of fashion film.

History 
The festival was inaugurated in 2013 by experts across the film and fashion industries, under the leadership of Beatrice Bloom, the Festival President and Director. The first award show was in 2014. Each year, filmmakers, designers, agencies and labels all over the world are allowed to submit entries of their work which would then be reviewed by the organisers before an official list is Nominated for the award proper. The award festival will involve screening of the Nominated fashion films, presentation of the awards, a question and answer session and an after party The festival has showcased works of brands like Swarovski, Revlon, Juicy Couture and Harper's Bazaar.

Winners and Nominations

2014 
The 2014 maiden edition had 40 screened films from 13 categories out of which winners were Nominated.

2015 
The 2nd edition of the festival was held on 15 September 2015 at Mondrian Hotel, London. 35 short films and documentaries were screened from 13 categories.

2016 
The 2016 edition of the festival took place on 14 September 2016. There were 14 categories of awards.

2017 
The fourth edition of the awards took place on 14 September 2017 and with attendees from United States, Canada, Spain and Italy. During the event, 60 individual films were shown to an audience of filmmakers and fashion professionals.

2018 
The festival's fifth edition took place on 14 September 2018, drawing attendees from all over the world. It featured about 70 individual films which were shown to the audience during the event.

2019 
The festival's sixth edition took place on the 13th  of September 2019. A new category: Best Artistic Director was added to the awards.

2020 
In the year 2020, due to the global pandemic caused by the novel COVID-19 virus, and the subsequent lockdown/restriction of movements in the UK, the festival's seventh edition was held virtually between the 12 and 13 September 2020 via the company's website. That year also saw the addition of new categories of awards: Best Emerging Talent, Best Children Fashion Film and Best Hairstyle. Also, The Best Actor/Model category was split into three: Best Actress (Model), Best Actor (Model), and Best Child Actor (Model) respectfully

References

External links 
 

Annual events in London
Fashion events in England
Film festivals established in 2014
2014 establishments in England
Fashion festivals
Film festivals in London
Short film festivals in the United Kingdom